The DFB-Pokal 2008–09 was the 29th season of the competition. The first round began on 30 August 2008. In the final, held on 30 May 2009 in Berlin FCR 2001 Duisburg defeated Turbine Potsdam 7–0, marking the highest margin by which a Frauen DFB-Pokal final was ever decided.

1st round
The top six clubs from last year's Bundesliga season were automatically qualified for the second round of the cup. These were 1. FFC Frankfurt, Turbine Potsdam, FCR 2001 Duisburg, Bayern Munich, SC 07 Bad Neuenahr, and VfL Wolfsburg. The other clubs from the Bundesliga all won their first round match.

2nd round
In the second round Bayern Munich defeated title holder 1. FFC Frankfurt who was for the first time since 1998 not present in the DFB-Pokal final. The other match between clubs from the Bundesliga was won by SG Essen-Schönebeck against HSV Borussia Friedenstal.

3rd round

Quarter-finals

Semi-finals

Final

DFB-Pokal Frauen seasons
Pokal
Fra